The 1998 Westar Rules season was the second season of ‘Westar Rules’ and the 114th season of the various incarnations of senior football in Perth.

The Sandover Medal was awarded to Adrian Bromage. Todd Ridley won the Bernie Naylor Medal for kicking the most goals during the home-and-away rounds.

East Fremantle achieved its best record since its unique perfect season of 1946, winning all except its fourth and fifth games and achieving an unbeaten run of sixteen games rivalled since the perfect season only by Claremont in 1987 who was unbeaten for twenty-one games after having won the Grand Final.

Home-and-away season

Round 1

Round 2

Round 3

Round 4

Round 5

Round 6

Round 7

Round 8

Round 9

Round 10

Round 11

Round 12

Round 13

Round 14

Round 15

Round 16

Round 17

Round 18

Round 19

Round 20

Round 21

Round 22

Round 23

Ladder

Finals series

Semi-finals

Preliminary final

Grand Final

References

External links
Official WAFL website
Westar Rules Season 1998

West Australian Football League seasons
Westar Rules